Gerger-e Olya (also Romanized as Gerger-e ‘Olyā and Gar Gar-e ‘Olyā; also known as Gerger-e Bālā) is a village in Amirabad Rural District, Muchesh District, Kamyaran County, Kurdistan Province, Iran. At the 2006 census, its population was 546, in 115 families. The village is populated by Kurds.

References 

Towns and villages in Kamyaran County
Kurdish settlements in Kurdistan Province